The 2012–13 Lithuanian Football Cup was the 24th season of the Lithuanian annual football knock-out tournament. The competition started on 15 June 2012 with the matches of the first round and ended with the final on 19 May 2013, when Žalgiris Vilnius defeated FC Šiauliai in penalty kicks.

Žalgris qualified for the first qualifying round of the 2013–14 UEFA Europa League.

First round
These matches were played around 15 June 2012. 

|}

Second round
These matches were played around 8 July 2012.

|}

Third round
These matches were played between 13 and 29 August 2012. 

|}

Fourth round
These matches were played between 19 and 28 September 2012. 

|}

Fifth round
These matches were played on 22, 23 and 24 October 2012. 

|}

Quarterfinals
These matches took place on 6 and 7 November 2012. 

|}

Semifinals
The 4 winners from the previous round entered this stage of the competition. Unlike the previous rounds of the competition, this was played over two legs. The first legs were played on 16 and 17 April 2013 and the second legs were played on 30 April and 1 May 2013.

|}

Final

References

External links
 omnitel.net

Cup
Cup
2012–13 domestic association football cups
2012-13